Golf coverage on Fox Sports properties have occurred occasionally since 1999. From 1999 through 2002, its regional sports network group Fox Sports Networks (FSN) sub-licensed early-round coverage of PGA Tour events from Golf Channel (a network in which Fox was an early investor).

From 2015 to June 2020, Fox served as the broadcaster of the national open tournaments and amateur championships of the United States Golf Association (USGA), including the U.S. Open — one of the four Men's major golf championships, under a 12-year deal. Coverage aired on the Fox broadcast network, Fox Sports 1, Fox Sports 2, and Fox Deportes. In late-June 2020, however, Fox announced that it would opt out of the contract, and sell the remainder to former USGA broadcast television rightsholder NBC Sports.

Background

Early Fox Sports golf involvement
Fox Sports partnered with Greg Norman in the early 1990s to create the World Golf Tour, which would have consisted of six events televised on Fox. However, the proposed events were met with legal issues (including a threat by PGA Tour commissioner Tim Finchem to suspend any golfer who participates). In 1996, Fox acquired a minority stake in Golf Channel.

Fox Sports bid for a portion of the PGA Tour's television rights starting in 1999. Although it did not gain the broadcast package (which was divided among the Big Three networks), Golf Channel would simulcast its early-round coverage on Fox's regional sports networks group Fox Sports Networks, as they had wider carriage. These simulcasts ended after 2002, when the PGA Tour's cable rights were acquired by ESPN and USA Network. Fox had also sold its minority stakes in Golf Channel and Outdoor Life Network to Comcast, as part of its acquisition of its stake in Speedvision.

In 2011, Fox Sports gained the rights to the CVS Caremark Charity Classic, which is an unofficial money event on the PGA Tour, and had been previously televised by Golf Channel.  The coverage aired on Fox Sports Net, with Kraig Kann hosting. Fox did not renew its rights for 2012.

USGA coverage
On August 6, 2013, Fox Sports announced a 12-year, $1.1 billion deal to broadcast the open tournaments and amateur championships of the USGA, including the U.S. Open, U.S. Senior Open, and U.S. Women's Open, beginning in 2015. Fox would replace NBC and ESPN as the rightsholders of the events. NBC's lead analyst Johnny Miller expressed disappointment at the loss, saying that he "had a feeling" NBC would not retain rights, and that Fox would not be able to "fall out of a tree and do the U.S. Open."

As a prelude to the new package, Fox televised the 2014 Franklin Templeton Shootout, debuting its lead commentary team of Joe Buck and Greg Norman. Fox's first U.S. Open had a total of 38.5 hours of coverage, with 22 on Thursday and Friday, and 16.5 hours on Saturday and Sunday; the Fox Sports 1 cable network had a total of 16 hours of coverage on Thursday and Friday. The Fox broadcast network had a total of 22.5 hours of coverage Thursday through Sunday, with six hours Thursday and Friday, and 16.5 hours Saturday and Sunday. Fox utilized a number of new technologies during its production, including drone flyovers, a camera-equipped RC car for ground perspectives, and new graphics—including a live shot tracer, an augmented reality display of green contours, and a persistent top-5 leaderboard displayed in the bottom-right of the screen.

Fox's coverage received mixed reviews by critics and viewers, noting technical issues with on-air graphics during early coverage of the first round, on-air personnel (including the chemistry between Buck and Norman, and use of NFL reporters such as Curt Menefee), and missed shots due to poor camera angles or other on-air segments, although Buck did receive positive reviews by some, as well as Fox's technical innovations.

In the lead-up to the 2016 U.S. Open, Norman was dismissed by Fox, and replaced by Paul Azinger.

End of coverage 
On June 29, 2020, it was announced that Fox Sports had opted out of the remaining seven years of its contract to cover USGA events, and had sold the remainder of the contract to NBC Sports. The re-scheduling of the 2020 U.S. Open to September due to the COVID-19 pandemic had caused conflicts with Fox's football coverage, and the USGA ruled out moving the tournament exclusively to cable instead. While the network discussed the possibility of partnering with NBC on the 2020 tournament, this eventually "led to a broader conversation and eventual agreement for NBCUniversal to take over the USGA media rights".

Theme music 
Fox did not carry over "In Celebration of Man", the Yanni-composed music that had been used by NBC for its U.S. Open coverage, choosing to commission film composer Brian Tyler to compose new music (after acquiring rights to The Open Championship beginning in 2016, NBC instated an updated version of "In Celebration of Man" as its theme music for the tournament). Tyler explained that his composition was intended to "capture the epic struggle, the challenge, the history, the heartbreak, and the elation of competitive golf," and acknowledged that "Sports and music have always had an important connection for me. I love the way iconic sports themes evoke the spirit of sporting events and can provide dramatic impact and nostalgic memory."

Commentators

On April 23, 2014, Fox Sports announced that Greg Norman would join Joe Buck as its lead golf commentary team. Buck and Norman worked together for the first time at the 2014 U.S. Open, where Fox produced studio programming that aired against ESPN and NBC's studio shows.

2015 U.S. Open

On November 18, 2014, in advance of its coverage of the Franklin Templeton Shootout, Fox announced the full layout of its golf team.

Booth announcers: Joe Buck, Greg Norman
Tower announcers: Brad Faxon, Corey Pavin, Tom Weiskopf
On-course reporters: Juli Inkster, Steve Flesch, Scott McCarron, Charles Davis, Jay Delsing
Rules analyst: David Fay
Course design analyst: Gil Hanse
Studio Host: Curt Menefee
Interviews: Holly Sonders
Essays: Shane O'Donoghue
Featured Group: Tim Brando, Mark Brooks, Natalie Gulbis, Buddy Marucci
U.S. Open 360: Joel Klatt, Joe Ogilvie, Morgan Pressel, EA Tischler

2016 U.S. Open

In January 2016, Greg Norman was let go by Fox in response to poor reception towards his performance during the U.S. Open, and was replaced by former ESPN analyst Paul Azinger. The network's 2016 U.S. Open team:

Booth announcers: Joe Buck, Paul Azinger, Brad Faxon
Tower announcers: Mark Brooks, Steve Flesch
On-course reporters: Curtis Strange, Juli Inkster, Scott McCarron, Ken Brown
Rules analyst: David Fay
Course design analyst: Gil Hanse
Studio Host: Holly Sonders
Interviews: Shane Bacon
Essays: Shane O'Donoghue
Featured Groups Hosts: Joel Klatt, Justin Kutcher
Featured Groups Analysts: Luke Elvy, Olin Browne, Brett Quigley, Scott Simpson

2017 U.S. Open

In 2017, Fox made several changes to the commentator team:

Lead announcers: Joe Buck, Paul Azinger, Brad Faxon
Tower announcers: Shane O'Donoghue, Darren Clarke
On-course reporters: Curtis Strange, Steve Flesch, Juli Inkster, Ken Brown
Rules analyst: David Fay 
Course design analyst: Gil Hanse
Studio Host: Holly Sonders
Interviews: Shane Bacon

2018 U.S. Open

For the 2018 U.S. Open, Fox announced that they would be splitting their lead commentary booths into two teams.  This was done in an effort to avoid the occasional logjam caused by a three-man booth, which had been Joe Buck with analysts Paul Azinger and Brad Faxon. Therefore, Azinger would now be paired with Buck, and Faxon would be paired alongside Shane Bacon.

Lead announcers: Joe Buck, Paul Azinger
Secondary announcers: Shane Bacon, Brad Faxon
On-course reporters: Curtis Strange, Steve Flesch, Ken Brown & Brett Quigley
Rules analyst: David Fay
Course design analyst: Gil Hanse
Studio Host: Holly Sonders
Interviews: Shane O'Donoghue

References

External links

Fox Sports 1 original programming
Fox Sports original programming
Golf on television